Laugh! Laugh! Laugh! (Italian: Ridere! Ridere! Ridere!) is a 1954 Italian comedy film directed by Edoardo Anton and starring Tino Scotti, Ugo Tognazzi and Carlo Dapporto.

The film's sets were designed by the art director Beni Montresor. It was shot in Ferraniacolor.

Plot 
Mr. Spinotti travels on a train. He passes the inspector and asks the users for their tickets. Our protagonist argues with the inspector, but little by little he begins to tell stories and jokes to those present.

Cast
 Tino Scotti as Commissario Rossi 
 Ugo Tognazzi as Dottore 
 Carlo Dapporto as François Salvo 
 Sandra Mondaini as Innamorata litigiosa 
 Riccardo Billi as Controllore 
 Mario Riva as Otello Spinotti 
 Alberto Talegalli as Pignolo 
 Gianni Bonos as Mimo
 Luigi Bonos as Mimo 
 Vittorio Bonos as Mimo 
 Paolo Panelli as Innamorato litigioso 
 Paolo Ferrari as Corteggiatore 
 Pina Gallini as Vecchietta 
 Raffaele Pisu as Ubriaco 
 Galeazzo Benti as Snob 
 Raimondo Vianello as Paziente da operare 
 Nino Manfredi as Signore che non vuole pagare 
 Monica Vitti as Maria Teresa

References

Bibliography 
 Chiti, Roberto & Poppi, Roberto. Dizionario del cinema italiano: Dal 1945 al 1959. Gremese Editore, 1991.

External links 
 

1954 films
Italian comedy films
1954 comedy films
1950s Italian-language films
Films directed by Edoardo Anton
Titanus films
Italian black-and-white films
1950s Italian films